Carpathonesticus simoni  is an araneomorph spider species of the family Nesticidae. It occurs in Romania, where it can be found in caves. It was transferred from the genus Nesticus to Carpathonesticus in 1980 by Lehtinen and Saaristo.

Description
The prosoma and appendages are a pale reddish yellow with a very faint pattern; the opisthosoma likewise is very faintly patterned, but also has three pairs of blotches. Prosoma length is 2.4 mm in females and 2.1 mm in males.

Original publication

References 

Nesticidae
Spiders of Europe
Spiders described in 1931